Pavel Kuzmich Yakovlev was a Soviet Olympic middle-distance runner. He represented his country in the men's 1500 meters at the 1980 Summer Olympics. His time was a 3:44.19 in the first heat.

References 

1958 births
Living people
Soviet male middle-distance runners
Olympic athletes of the Soviet Union
Athletes (track and field) at the 1980 Summer Olympics
Goodwill Games medalists in athletics
Competitors at the 1986 Goodwill Games